is a village located in Nagano Prefecture, Japan. , the village had an estimated population of 9,007 in 4267 households, and a population density of 48 persons per km2. Hakuba is located in the eastern foothills of the Hida Mountains in the northern part of the Japanese Alps and is world famous as a ski resort. It is also the starting point for trekking Mount Shirouma and Mount Goryu, two of the One Hundred Mountains of Japan. As the surrounding valley has an annual snow fall of over 11 meters, it is the central hub for 10 ski resorts with more than 200 runs. The village was the main event venue for 1998 Winter Olympics (Alpine, Ski Jump, Crosscountry).

Geography
Hakuba is located in a mountain basin in far northwestern Nagano Prefecture, bordered by Toyama Prefecture to the west. The 2900 meter Ushiro-Tateyama Mountains border the village to the west. Much of the village is within the borders of the Chūbu-Sangaku National Park.

Surrounding municipalities
Nagano Prefecture
 Otari
 Nagano
 Ōmachi
 Ogawa
Niigata Prefecture
 Itoigawa
Toyama Prefecture
Kurobe
Asahi

Climate
The village has  humid continental climate (Köppen Dfa), with cold, extremely snowy winters, and warm, rainy summers. Hakuba receives 6 meters of snowfall annually, with most snowfall occurring in the months of January and February.

History
The area of present-day Hakuba was part of ancient Shinano Province and was part of the territory controlled by Matsumoto Domain under the Tokugawa shogunate of the Edo period.  Hakuba was once part of the route called the Salt Road used to bring salt and other marine products from the coast at Itoigawa in Echigo Province (now Niigata Prefecture). However, much of the area was still virgin forest well into the Meiji period, and a census in 1881 counted only 31 households.

The modern village of Hakuba was established on September 30, 1956 by the merger of the villages of Hokujo and Kamishiro.

Hakuba and surrounding municipalities were impacted by a reported 6.7 magnitude earthquake on 22 November 2014.  The quake hit at 10:08pm at a depth of 5 km causing a number of residential properties to collapse and injuring at least 41 people.  Despite some localized road damage and a suspension of rail services on sections of the Ōito Line, there was however no major impact on hotels or ski tourism related infrastructure.

Demographics 
Per Japanese census data, the population of Hakuba peaked around the year 2000 and has declined since.

Economy
The economy of Hakuba is heavily dependent on seasonal tourism.

Education
Hakuba has two public elementary schools and one public middle school operated by the village government. The village has one public high school operated by the Nagano Prefectural Board of Education.

Hakuba International School will be the newest school within the region. The international school is a boarding school which allows students from Japan to experience the tranquility and adventure Hakuba has to offer. The school follows the International Baccalaureate system which helps students focus on global issues such as living sustainably.

Transportation

Railway
 East Japan Railway Company – Ōito Line
  -  -  -  -

Highway

International relations
 – Oberwiesenthal, Germany, friendship city
 – Lech am Arlberg, Austria, friendship city

Local attractions
Surrounded by the Sea of Japan (northward), Nagano City (eastward) and the Tateyama Kurobe Dam area (southward), Hakuba is also a popular summer vacation area which offers a variety of outdoor activities at an altitude of 700–800 metres, e.g. hiking, rafting/shower climbing, paragliding, mountain bike, bird sighting etc. Other day activities to enjoy include visiting the snow monkeys, kimono experiences, Taiko drumming, traditional cooking classes, Matsumoto castle tours and more.

Ski resorts

The Hakuba Valley (which also includes the neighboring cities of Omachi and Otari) is home to 10 resorts, including 135 lifts (inc. 5 gondolas) accessing over 200 runs that offer an expanse of terrain and at least 14 terrain parks. There are 960 hectares of skiable terrain which equates to 137  km of piste. The Hakuba ski resorts aren't interconnected via the slopes (except for Hakuba 47 and Goryu, and Cortina and Norikura), but they can be accessed off a common lift ticket and there are free shuttle buses to get around to the different ski areas. The ski resorts from north to south are: Cortina, Norikura, Tsugaike Kogen, Iwatake, Happo-One, Hakuba 47 (ja), Goryu, Sanosaka, Kashimayari and Jigatake.

Hakuba offers varied forms of skiing across the resorts but it is generally very well suited to beginners and intermediates with many long perfectly groomed runs and fantastic fall-line. There's also some world-class back country skiing on offer.

Hakuba has lessons and guiding available through both traditional Japanese ski schools and International ski schools including Hakuba Ski Concierge, Evergreen International Ski School, Happo-one Ski and Snowboard School, Hakuba Snow Sports School and Hakuba 47 Ski Academy International.

Duing the winter, many athletes go to the Hakuba Ski Jumping Stadium to challenge themselves with the 90-meter and 120-meter jumps they offer. It is a perfect place for advanced skiers to test their skills. The stadium also provides activities for all levels.

In popular culture
The ski resorts and village of Hakuba were the setting for the 2008 Japanese film "Gin Iro No Shiizun" (銀色のシーズン).
Hakuba is shown in episodes 21 and 22 of the anime Great Teacher Onizuka.
Hakuba is where Soma Cruz from Castlevania: Aria of Sorrow and Castlevania: Dawn of Sorrow lives.

References

External links
 

Official Website 
Hakuba Official Tourism Website 
Hakuba Resorts (in English)

 
Villages in Nagano Prefecture
Ski areas and resorts in Japan